Salgadinho may refer to one of the following places in Brazil:
 Salgadinho, Pernambuco
 Salgadinho, Paraíba
 In Portuguese cuisine, small savoury snacks (literally "salties")